The IMPDH RNA motif is a conserved RNA structure that was discovered by bioinformatics.
IMPDH motif RNAs are found in organisms classified within the genus Faecalibacterium.

IMPDH RNAs are often located upstream of genes that encode inosine monophosphate dehydrogenase.  However, some instances of the IMPDH motif are not upstream of protein-coding genes.  Therefore, it is ambiguous whether IMPDH RNAs function as cis-regulatory elements or whether they operate in trans.

The IMPDH RNA motif includes one pseudoknot, but one stem involved in this apparent pseudoknot exhibits only one example of covariation, so the existence of the pseudoknot is unclear.

References

Non-coding RNA